Larry Joseph Franco (born April 5, 1949) is an American film producer. He has also served as an actor, second unit director and assistant director. He is the father of former Atlanta Braves baseball player Matt Franco and Phronsie Franco. He is the ex-brother-in-law of actor Kurt Russell and the ex-son-in-law of actor Bing Russell. Franco attended UCLA film school.

Filmography
He was a producer in all films unless otherwise noted.

Assistant director
 March or Die (1977)
 The Rose (1979)

First assistant director
 Elvis (1979) (TV movie)
 The Fog (1980)
 Cutter's Way (1981)
 Escape from New York (1981)
 The Thing (1982)
 Christine (1983)
 Starman (1984)
 Big Trouble in Little China (1986)
 Prince of Darkness (1987)
 They Live (1988)

Second assistant director
 Harry and Walter Go to New York (1976)
 Black Sunday (1977)
 Straight Time (1978)
 Foul Play (1978)
 Apocalypse Now (1979)

Acting credits

External links

1949 births
Film producers from California
Living people
People from Sonora, California